A Handful of Friends is a 1976 play by David Williamson.

It was written for the South Australian Theatre Company.

Williamson said in an interview with Quadrant magazine that he had based one of the characters on Williamson's wife, Kristin, and another on his then-friend Bob Ellis. Ellis complained about this in print leading to a public argument between him and Williamson which became notorious.

References

External links

Plays by David Williamson
1976 plays